Alex Arancibia Chavez (born January 28, 1990) commonly known as Arancibia, is a Bolivian professional footballer who plays for Liga de Fútbol Profesional Boliviano club Aurora.

Club career
Arancibia started to play for Oriente B of Primera A. He made some important saves in the 2009 season to avoid relegation. Gustavo Quinteros called his name for the Oriente Petrolero 2010 squad and he became the reserve goalkeeper at Oriente Petrolero.

After spending the 2015–16 season with Club Petrolero, he joined Wilstermann on 30 June 2016.

Arancibia signed with Sport Boys Warnes for the 2019 season.

International career
Arancibia made four appearances for the Bolivia U-20 team at the 2009 South American U-20 Championship. He was twice named as a substitute for the senior team during qualification for the 2018 FIFA World Cup, but did not play.

References

External links
 
 

1990 births
Living people
Sportspeople from Santa Cruz de la Sierra
Bolivian footballers
Association football goalkeepers
Oriente Petrolero players
Club Petrolero players
C.D. Jorge Wilstermann players
Sport Boys Warnes players
Bolivian Primera División players